Maragatham is a 1959 Indian Tamil-language crime thriller film produced, directed and co-written by S. M. Sriramulu Naidu. It is an adaptation of the novel Karunkuyil Kunrathu Kolai by T. S. D. Sami. The film stars Sivaji Ganesan and Padmini. It was released on 21 August 1959.

Plot

Cast 

Male Cast
 Sivaji Ganesan as Varendran
 T. S. Balaiah
 Chandrababu as Gundan
 S. Balachander as Anandar, Maranamarthanda Zamindar
 T. S. Durairaj
 O. A. K. Thevar
 Narayana Pillai
 Santhanam
 Kanaiah
 Pakkirisamy
 Natarajan

Female Cast
 Padmini as Maragatham, Alamu
 Sandhya as Karpagavalli
 Gnanam
 Muthulakshmi
 Lakshmiprabha
 Lakshmirajam
 Saraswathi

Production 
Maragadham was directed by S. M. Sriramulu Naidu, who also produced it under Pakshiraja Studios. The film was based on Karunkuyil Kunrathu Kolai, a novel by T. S. D. Sami. Naidu wrote the screenplay and Murasoli Maran wrote the dialogues. Cinematography was handled by Sailen Bose, art direction by A. K. Sekhar, and editing by Velusamy.

Soundtrack 
The music was composed by S. M. Subbaiah Naidu, with lyrics by Yogi Shuddhananda Bharathiar, Papanasam Sivan, Ku. Ma. Balasubramaniam & Ra. Balu.

"Kunguma Poovey Konjum Puraavey" became a hit song. However, there is a controversy about this song. It is said that the tune for this song was composed by T. G. Lingappa for the film Sabaash Meena. However, for some reason, Chandrababu refused to sing the song for that film. Later he gave this tune to Subbaiah Naidu and  it was included in this film.

Release and reception 
Maragadham was released on 21 August 1959, and failed commercially.

References

Bibliography

External links 
 

1950s crime thriller films
1950s Tamil-language films
1959 films
Films based on Indian novels
Films directed by S. M. Sriramulu Naidu
Indian crime thriller films
Films scored by S. M. Subbaiah Naidu